Mostafa Shalaby (born  1 January 1994) is an Egyptian professional footballer who plays as a forward for Egyptian Premier League club Zamalek. Shalaby signed for Zamalek coming from ENPPI SC in the summer transfers of 2022–23 season.

References

Living people
1994 births
Egyptian footballers
Association football forwards
Zamalek SC players
ENPPI SC players
Egyptian Premier League players